Maxilla Blue is an American hip hop  trio based out of Des Moines, Iowa formed in 2006, consisting of the Emcee Ashphate Woodhavet, Turntablist, DJ TouchNice, and producer Aeon Grey.

Career 
Their debut eponymous album was released May 6, 2008 by Central Standard Records, an Iowa-bred underground label co-founded by Aeon Grey.  The album set the tone for subsequent works, establishing an approach which consistently includes a significant portion of the work presented without vocals, providing an overall presentation of an instrumental and poetically commentated piece. Through tour-work, the group has appeared live in the Midwest, Mountain, West coast and Southwestern U.S regions, Germany and France.

Vol. 2 was released June 15, 2010, also on Central Standard Records, marking the first edition of the ongoing series to be presented to the public as a vinyl LP as well as compact disc and digital form.

Vol. 3's retail release date of February 28, 2012 marked the 5th collaborative work from the trio and the 3rd of the self-titled series.  The third installment was completed as a split release between Central Standard Records and Galapagos4.  Joining the likes of Qwel & Maker, Typical Cats, Qwazaar, Batsauce and various other underground rap and hip hop production veterans, Maxilla's most recent work is again presented in the 3 aforementioned formats.

Musical contributions and style

The vocal pieces are known for dynamic use of voice and often esoteric wordplay unique to the track paired with it, which at times, has been known to lead non-familiar listeners to assume that multiple vocalists play a part in the work.  To date, no featuring of any other vocal artist has appeared on a Maxilla Blue record, as all production and Turntablism has also been exclusively provided by Aeon Grey and Dj TouchNice.  Members of the group have noted no intention of altering this trend, publicly stating that it is unnecessary to feature external components to create their sound.  Each member has, however, participated in numerous side-works with other artists to create pieces under various titles.  As the approach and presentation has remained intact, each subsequent release has carried the self-titled attribute, distinguished only by the numbered volume.  It is said that were it not for the necessity of distinguishing the releases from each other for distributive purposes, the trio would have released each record simply as "Maxilla Blue," leaving the familiar listener and general consumers to differentiate the body of work.

Recognition and awards

2011 Cedar Rapids Independent Film Festival Gold Eddy for The Shovel Kids music video directed and edited by Carlos De León.
Des Moines Register 2010 Mixies Award Hip-Hop Cartographers (for putting Iowa Hip hop on the map).
2010 Zzz Records' Best selling local album of the year.

Discography

Albums 

2008: Maxilla Blue
2009: BumRap: Underpass Logic (Also ft. prod from Bashir)
2010: Maxilla Blue Vol. 22011: BumRap: Median Risers (Also ft. prod from Bashir & The Shovel Kids)
2012: Maxilla Blue Vol. 3

References 
2012 Fifth Element Album Review
2012 Berkeley, CA Amoeba Music Hip Hop Rap-Up
http://www.therooster.com/blog/asphate-maxilla-blue-talks-hip-hop-graffiti-and-colorado-crush-2013
http://www.zzzrecords.com/year2010.html
http://www.dmcityview.com/2009/11/12/features/
http://www.dmcityview.com/2010/07/01/music/stage.html
http://www.dmcityview.com/2010/05/06/music/stage.html
https://web.archive.org/web/20110914130039/http://www.whiskeyteeth.com/2010/08/mp3-download-maxilla-blue-vision-twunny.html
http://abovegroundmagazine.com/the-leak/vids/03/03/maxilla-blue-shovel-kids/
http://desmoines.metromix.com/music/blog_post/gaiden-gadema-maxilla-blue/1176346/content
http://desmoines.metromix.com/music/article/80-35-music-festival/2038563/content
http://desmoines.metromix.com/music/standard_photo_gallery/the-2010-mixies-awards/1865441/content

External links 
Maxilla Blue Homepage
Maxilla Blue FaceBook page
Galapagos4 Artist Page

Midwest hip hop groups
Musical groups from Des Moines, Iowa
American musical trios